Popradské pleso (once called Rybie pleso) is a mountain lake of glacial origin located in the High Tatras, Slovakia.

Popradské pleso is one of the most visited spots in High Tatras and a starting point for many popular hikes including to Rysy and Kôprovský štít. Near to the lake there is Symbolic Cemetery, built in a memory of the victims of the High Tatras.

Lakes of the High Tatras
Lakes of Slovakia
Drone video of Popradské pleso